Parectatosia is a genus of longhorn beetles of the subfamily Lamiinae, containing the following species:

 Parectatosia borneensis Breuning, 1940
 Parectatosia robusta  (Aurivillius, 1911)
 Parectatosia valida Breuning, 1940

References

Desmiphorini